Santi Cosma e Damiano is a church in central Brescia, a region of Lombardy, Italy.

History
Of the 12th-century Romanesque construction, only the bell-tower remains; the present facade and interiors mainly date to a reconstruction in the 18th century. The main altar (18th century) in polychrome marble has statues by Antonio Callegari and altarpiece by Giambettino Cignaroli and a 16th-century Ark of San Tiziano. Adjacent to the church is a 15th-century cloister. In 1923, at the instigation of a local poet Angelo Canossi, the names of the Italians who died in the war were inscribed in the columns.

References

Churches in the province of Brescia
Buildings and structures in Brescia
Romanesque architecture in Brescia
Baroque architecture in Brescia